Marantochloa is a genus of plant in family Marantaceae described as a genus in 1860. It is native to tropical Africa and to islands in the Indian Ocean.

 Species

References

 
Zingiberales genera
Flora of Africa
Taxonomy articles created by Polbot
Taxa named by Adolphe-Théodore Brongniart
Taxa named by Jean Antoine Arthur Gris